Shetrunji River (alternate: Satrunji) is an eastward-flowing river in Bhavnagar, Gujarat, in western India.

Geography
It rises northeast of the Gir Hills, near Dhari in Amreli district. Situated  eastward of the river's mouth is Sultanpur Shoal.

Along with the Ghelo, Kalubhar, and the Vagad Rivers, the Shetrunji is a principal river of the district, and the second largest river in the region of Saurashtra. Khodiyar Mata is an approximately  waterfall near Dhari. The topography is a mix of hills and plains.

Features
The Palitana dam was built in 1959 across the river at Nani-Rajasthali and represents Shetrunji's irrigation scheme. Shetrunji supplies drinking water to Bhavnagar. A small port is located at Sultanpur.

Culture
Palitana is situated near the river, serving as the base town for the hills of Shatrunjaya upon which are the Palitana temples, an important place of worship for Jains.A group of Derasars are located at the banks of the river near to the Shatrunjaya hills.

A shrine of Khodiar Mata is situated within the Shetrunji's lower reaches. Middle to Upper Palaeolithic sites have been found along the river. Archaeological exploration along the river has noted 22 settlements which date circa 1st century BCE to 1st century CE. The sites included nine fishing villages, a mixed use fishing-agrarian village, a mixed use agrarian-salt-farming village, as well as a regional centre. Of these, Padri village dates to the Harappan period, while Hathab village was the largest in the lower river valley,

References

Rivers of Gujarat
Rivers of India